Daniel Stout House, also known as the Old Stone House and Hubert Brown House, is a historic home located in Bloomington Township, Monroe County, Indiana.  It was built in 1828, and is a two-story, stone dwelling representative of a pioneer farmhouse.  It is believed that its builder Daniel Stout also helped to build Grouseland at Vincennes, Indiana.  The house was restored in the 1940s.

It was listed on the National Register of Historic Places in 1973.  It is located in the Maple Grove Road Rural Historic District.

References

Houses on the National Register of Historic Places in Indiana
Houses completed in 1828
Buildings and structures in Monroe County, Indiana
National Register of Historic Places in Monroe County, Indiana
Historic district contributing properties in Indiana